The 2015 Nigerian Senate election in Zamfara State was held on March 28, 2015, to elect members of the Nigerian Senate to represent Zamfara State. Kabir Garba Marafa representing Zamfara Central, Tijjani Yahaya Kaura representing Zamfara North and Ahmad Sani Yerima representing Zamfara West all won on the platform of All Progressives Congress.

Overview

Summary

Results

Zamfara Central 
All Progressives Congress candidate Kabir Garba Marafa won the election, defeating People's Democratic Party candidate Ibrahim Shehu and other party candidates.

Zamfara North 
All Progressives Congress candidate Tijjani Yahaya Kaura won the election, defeating People's Democratic Party candidate Sahabi Alhaji Yaú and other party candidates.

Zamfara West 
All Progressives Congress candidate Ahmad Sani Yerima won the election, defeating People's Democratic Party candidate Bello Matawalle and other party candidates.

References 

Zamfara State Senate elections
March 2015 events in Nigeria
Zam